Dreams of Russian is a 1992 Japanese-Russian period film directed and co-written by Jun'ya Satō. It is based on a book of the same name by Japanese writer Yasushi Inoue.

Plot 
The film tells about real historical events in the interstate relations of the Russian Empire during the time of Catherine II and Japan during the time of the Tokugawa shogunate that occurred in the 1780s  - 1790s .

In 1782, the Japanese ship Shinsho-maru , captained by Daikokuya Kodai (Ogata), with a crew of 16 sailors, was caught in a storm. The sailors had to cut down the mast, and after a two hundred-day drift , the ship washed up on the Russian coast in the Aleutian Islands . Next, the Japanese were waiting for almost nine years of wandering around the Russian Empire in the hope of returning to their homeland.

Together with Russian fur traders, they build a ship and successfully sail from the Aleutian Islands to the mainland. Having reached Okhotsk , they are faced with a new problem: the local Russian administration provides them with assistance and provides temporary housing, but cannot independently resolve the issue of their return to Japan, since this requires the sanction of the Irkutsk governor . The Japanese are explained that sending a letter to the Irkutsk authorities and receiving a response will take about a year. The frustrated Japanese decide to get to Irkutsk on their own . The journey takes several months, during which the Japanese consider the Siberian winter a real hell. Arrival in Irkutskdoes not solve the problem: the post of governor is temporarily vacant and the request of the Japanese sailors has been forwarded to St. Petersburg, the regional authorities can only arrange Japanese teachers in Irkutsk as Japanese language teachers, but not return them to their homeland. In Irkutsk, Japanese sailors meet the Russian scientist and traveler, academician of the St. Petersburg Academy of Sciences Kirill Laksman, who takes an active part in their return to Japan. Laxman brings Captain Daikokuya Kodai to St. Petersburg in the hope of obtaining an audience with Empress Catherine II. Japanese sailors, seeing off the captain, have little faith in success (it's like trying to meet with the shogun ). In St. Petersburg, Laxman arranges an audience with the captain, Vice Chancellor A. A. Bezborodko , consults with him and Count A. R. Vorontsov . The gardener and maid of honor of Catherine II, influential at the court, also provide assistance to the Japanese. Some time later, the Japanese captain is granted an audience with the Russian Empress. Daikokuya Kodaiu begs her to return him to his homeland. Catherine II allows this, and in 1792 an expedition is equipped to the shores of Japan . On a Russian warship, only three Japanese sailors return to their homeland (two more wished to stay in Irkutsk, the rest died). The Japanese authorities receive the Russian embassy without hostility, but without much enthusiasm: Japan has a policy of self-isolation. The Japanese give permission for one Russian ship to enter Nagasaki , where the Japanese sailors land. One of the Japanese soon dies while in Ezo (in Hokkaido ). Friends manage to tell him that he is dying on Japanese soil, to which he still managed to return. The Japanese who returned to their homeland again find themselves in the balance of death - according to the laws of that time, they had to be executed. Only by order of the shogun were they pardoned.

At the end of the film, a voice-over reports that the activities of Kirill Laxman and Daikokui Kodai played a significant role in the development of relations between Russia and Japan and contributed to the establishment of diplomatic relations between these countries.

Cast 
 Ken Ogata	as Daikokuya Kōdayū
 Tōru Emori as Matsudaira Sadanobu
 Marina Vlady as Catherine the Great
 Oleg Yankovsky as Kirill Laxman
 Yevgeny Yevstigneyev as Bush, the court gardener
 Yuri Solomin as Alexander Bezborodko
 Vitaly Solomin as Grigory Shelikhov
 Vladimir Yeryomin as Alexander Vorontsov
 Boris Klyuyev aa Russian naval officer
 Anastasiya Nemolyaeva as Tatiana, an Irkutsk inhabitant  
 Vladimir Naumov as episode
 Viktor Stepanov as Nevidimov
 Aleksei Serebryakov as sailor

See also
 Embassy of Adam Laxman in Japan

References

External links
 

1992 films
Soviet historical drama films
Films set in Russia
Lenfilm films
Films about Catherine the Great
Russian historical drama films
Japanese historical drama films
1990s historical drama films
Russian multilingual films
Japanese multilingual films
1992 drama films
Films directed by Junya Satō
1990s Japanese films